Dream 4: Middleweight Grand Prix 2008 2nd Round was a mixed martial arts event held by FEG's mixed martial arts promotion DREAM. The event took place on June 15, 2008 at Yokohama Arena in Yokohama, Japan, featuring the second round of the promotion's Middleweight tournament, with winners advancing to the Dream 6: Middleweight Grand Prix 2008 Final Round at the Saitama Super Arena on September 23, 2008.

During the evening's intermission, a draw was held in the ring to determine the matchups for the July 21, 2008 Dream Lightweight GP Final in Osaka. The random selection set Eddie Alvarez against Tatsuya Kawajiri in the first semifinal; and Shinya Aoki against Caol Uno in the second.

The DREAM.4 attracted a crowd of 14,037 to the Yokohama Arena and was broadcast live in Japan on SkyPerfect TV Pay-Per-View, and in the United States on HDNet Fights.

Results

See also 
 Dream (mixed martial arts)
 List of Dream champions
 2008 in DREAM

Notes
Melvin Manhoef replaced Kiyoshi Tamura due to injuries Tamura incurred in his 1st round match. Manhoef had won a reserve bout against Dae Won Kim at Dream 3 to earn his spot in the 2nd round.
Mirko "Cro Cop" Filipović was originally scheduled to compete against Ralek Gracie in a grappling match, but had to pull out due to injury.

References

Dream (mixed martial arts) events
2008 in mixed martial arts
Mixed martial arts in Japan
Sport in Yokohama
2008 in Japan